Nansen Fjord is a fjord in King Christian IX Land, Eastern Greenland. It is part of the Sermersooq municipality.

Geography
This fjord lies in an indented area of the Blosseville Coast where there is a succession of rocky headlands with active glaciers in between. Its mouth lies between Cape J.A.D. Jensen on Sokongen Island to the west and Cape Nansen to the east. Most of the fjord is filled by the Christian IV Glacier at its head.

See also
List of fjords of Greenland

References

Fjords of Greenland